William Ludwig Jacobsen Jr. (born December 2, 1936) was the American Ambassador to Guinea-Bissau from November 13, 1989, to August 25, 1992. He also served as director of the U.S Liaison Office for Namibia from 1984 to 1985.
 
He received his undergraduate education at the University of Washington (1958) followed by a Master of Arts from Harvard University.

References

Ambassadors of the United States to Guinea-Bissau
University of Washington alumni
Harvard University alumni
1936 births
Living people
20th-century American diplomats